Opphaug is a village in the municipality of Ørland in Trøndelag county, Norway.

Opphaug has small-scale industry and a grain mill.

References

Villages in Trøndelag
Ørland